This is a list of the 382 chapter schools of the Cum Laude Society.

District I: Maine, Massachusetts, New Hampshire, Rhode Island, Vermont

Massachusetts
 Bancroft School
 Beaver Country Day School
 Belmont Hill School
 Berkshire School
 Brooks School
 Buckingham Browne & Nichols
 Cape Cod Academy
 Cushing Academy
 Dana Hall School
 Deerfield Academy
 The Governor's Academy
 Lawrence Academy at Groton
 Lincoln-Sudbury Regional High School
 MacDuffie School
 Milton Academy
 Miss Hall's School
 Newton South High School
 Noble and Greenough School
 Northfield Mount Hermon School
 Phillips Academy
 Pingree School
 The Rivers School
 Roxbury Latin School
 St. Mark's School
 St. Sebastian's School
 Tabor Academy
 Thayer Academy
 Walnut Hill School for the Arts
 Watertown High School
 Wilbraham and Monson Academy
 The Williston Northampton School
 Worcester Academy

Maine
 Berwick Academy
 Gould Academy
 Hebron Academy
 Kents Hill School
 North Yarmouth Academy
 Waynflete School

New Hampshire
 Holderness School
 Kimball Union Academy
 New Hampton School
 Phillips Exeter Academy
 St. Paul's School
 Tilton School

Rhode Island
Moses Brown School
Portsmouth Abbey School
Providence Classical High School
Providence Country Day School
St. George's School
Wheeler School

Vermont
 Vermont Academy

District II: New Jersey, Pennsylvania

New Jersey
 Blair Academy
 Cherry Hill High School East
 Doane Academy
 The Dwight-Englewood School
 Gill St. Bernard's School
 Hun School of Princeton
 Kent Place School
 Lawrenceville School
 Montclair Kimberley Academy
 Moorestown Friends School
 Morristown-Beard School
 Mount Saint Mary Academy
 Newark Academy
 Oak Knoll School of the Holy Child
 Oratory Preparatory School
 Peddie School
 Pennington School
 Pingry School
 Princeton Day School
 Ranney School
 Rutgers Preparatory School
 Saddle River Day School
 Wardlaw-Hartridge School

Pennsylvania
 Agnes Irwin School
 The Ellis School
 Episcopal Academy
 Friends' Central School
 Germantown Academy
 Haverford School
 The Hill School
 The Kiski School
 Mercersburg Academy
 Moravian Academy
 Mount Lebanon High School
 Perkiomen School
 Sewickley Academy
 Shady Side Academy
 Springside School
 William Penn Charter School
 Winchester Thurston School
 Wyoming Seminary 
 York Country Day School

District III: Connecticut, New York

Connecticut
 Avon Old Farms School
 Brunswick School
 Chase Collegiate School
 Choate Rosemary Hall
 Convent of the Sacred Heart
 Ethel Walker School
 Greens Farms Academy
 Greenwich Academy
 The Gunnery
 Hamden Hall Country Day School
 Hopkins School
 The Hotchkiss School
 Kent School
 King School
 Kingswood-Oxford School
 The Loomis Chaffee School
 Miss Porter's School
 Pomfret School
 St. Luke's School
 Salisbury School
 South Kent School
 Suffield Academy
 The Taft School
 The Williams School
 Wooster School

New York
 The Albany Academy
 Albany Academy for Girls
 Allendale Columbia School
 Berkeley Carroll School
 Birch Wathen Lenox School
 Buffalo Seminary
 Byram Hills High School
 Collegiate School
 Edgemont High School
 Emma Willard School
 Friends Academy
 Hackley School
 Hewitt School
 Horace Mann School
 Irvington High School
 Lawrence Woodmere Academy
 The Masters School
 Millbrook School
 Nichols School
 Nightingale-Bamford School
 Northwood School
 Packer Collegiate Institute
 Poly Prep Country Day School
 Portledge School
 The Stony Brook School
 The Storm King School
 Trinity School
 Trinity-Pawling School

District IV: District of Columbia, Delaware, Maryland, Virginia, Puerto Rico, International

District of Columbia
 Georgetown Visitation Preparatory School
 Maret School
 National Cathedral School
 St. Albans School

Delaware
 Sanford School
 The Tatnall School
 Tower Hill School

Maryland
 Bryn Mawr School
 Friends School of Baltimore
 Garrison Forest School
 The Gilman School
 Glenelg Country School
 Holton-Arms School
 Landon School
 McDonogh School
 Notre Dame Preparatory School
 Roland Park Country School
 St. Andrew's Episcopal School
 Saint James School
 Saint Paul's School
 St. Paul's School for Girls
 St. Timothy's School
 Severn School
 Stone Ridge School of the Sacred Heart
 Worcester Preparatory School

Virginia
 Cape Henry Collegiate School
 Chatham Hall
 Collegiate School
 The Covenant School
 Episcopal High School
 Flint Hill School
 Foxcroft School
 Fuqua School
 Hampton Roads Academy
 Norfolk Academy
 North Cross School
 St. Anne's-Belfield School
 St. Catherine's School
 St. Stephen's and St. Agnes School
 Virginia Episcopal School
 Woodberry Forest School

Puerto Rico
 Saint John's School Puerto Rico

International
 The American School In Switzerland
 The American School of Madrid
 The American School of Paris
 International School Manila
 Selwyn House
 TASIS England

District V: Alabama, Florida, Georgia, Mississippi, North Carolina, South Carolina

Alabama
 Montgomery Academy
 Randolph School
 UMS-Wright Preparatory School

Florida
 The Benjamin School
 Berkeley Preparatory School
 Canterbury School
 Community School of Naples
 Episcopal School of Jacksonville
 Gulliver Preparatory School
 Lake Highland Preparatory School
 Maclay School
 Montverde Academy
 Oak Hall School
 Out of Door Academy
 Pine Crest School
 Ransom Everglades School
 Saint Andrew's School
 Saint Edward's School
 St. Johns Country Day School
 St. Stephen's Episcopal School
 Shorecrest Preparatory School
 Tampa Preparatory School
 Trinity Preparatory School

Georgia
 Athens Academy
 Augusta Preparatory Day School
 Brookstone School
 Darlington School
 Holy Innocents' Episcopal School
 The Lovett School
 Mount de Sales Academy
 Pace Academy
 Rabun Gap-Nacoochee School
 Savannah Country Day School
 The Westminster Schools

Mississippi
 Jackson Academy
 Jackson Preparatory School
 St. Andrew's Episcopal School
 Tupelo High School

North Carolina
 Arendell Parrott Academy
 Asheville School
 Cannon School
 Charlotte Country Day School
 Charlotte Latin School
 Durham Academy
 Forsyth Country Day School
 Greensboro Day School
 The O'Neal School
 Providence Day School
 Ravenscroft School

South Carolina
 Christ Church Episcopal School
 Hammond School
 Heathwood Hall Episcopal School
 Porter-Gaud School
 Spartanburg Day School

District VI: Indiana, Kentucky, Michigan, Ohio, Tennessee

Indiana
 Canterbury School
 Culver Academies
 Indiana University High School
 Park Tudor School

Kentucky
 Highlands High School
 Kentucky Country Day School
 Louisville Collegiate School

Michigan
 Cranbrook Schools
 Detroit Country Day School
 Greenhills School
 University Liggett School

Ohio
 Anderson High School
 Bexley High School
 Chagrin Falls High School
 Cincinnati Country Day School
 Columbus Academy
 Columbus School for Girls
 Columbus Torah Academy
 Gilmour Academy
 Granville High School
 Hathaway Brown School
 Hawken School
 Laurel School
 Mariemont High School
 Maumee Valley Country Day School
 Seven Hills School
 University School
 Upper Arlington High School
 Walnut Hills High School
 Wellington School
 Western Reserve Academy
 Withrow High School

Tennessee
 Battle Ground Academy
 Baylor School
 Collierville High School
 Father Ryan High School
 Franklin Road Academy
 Girls Preparatory School
 Harpeth Hall School
 Hutchison School
 Lausanne Collegiate School
 The McCallie School
 Memphis University School
 Montgomery Bell Academy
 St. Andrew's-Sewanee School
 St. George's Independent School
 St. Mary's Episcopal School
 University School of Nashville
 The Webb School
 Webb School of Knoxville

District VII: Arkansas, Illinois, Kansas, Louisiana, Minnesota, Missouri, Oklahoma, Texas, Wisconsin

Arkansas
 Episcopal Collegiate School
 Hall High School
 Little Rock Central High School
 Pulaski Academy

Illinois
 Elgin Academy
 Glenbrook South High School
 Lake Forest Academy
 Lake Forest High School
 Latin School of Chicago
 Morgan Park Academy
 Oak Park & River Forest High School

Kansas
 Wichita Collegiate School

Louisiana
 Isidore Newman School
 Metairie Park Country Day School
 St. Martin's Episcopal School

Minnesota
 The Blake School
 Breck School
 Mounds Park Academy
 St. Paul Academy & Summit School
 Shattuck-St. Mary's School

Missouri
 The Barstow School
 Mary Institute and St. Louis Country Day School
 Pembroke Hill School
 Principia School

Oklahoma
 Casady School
 Heritage Hall School
 Holland Hall School

Texas
 All Saints Episcopal School
 Cistercian Preparatory School
 Episcopal School of Dallas
 Fort Worth Country Day School
 Greenhill School
 The Hockaday School
 The John Cooper School
 The Kinkaid School
 Parish Episcopal School
 St. John's School
 St. Mark's School of Texas
 Saint Mary's Hall
 St. Stephen's Episcopal School

Wisconsin
 Brookfield Academy
 The Prairie School
 University Lake School
 University School of Milwaukee
 Wayland Academy

District VIII: California, Colorado, Hawaii, New Mexico, Oregon, Washington

California
 The Bishop's School
 The Branson School
 Brentwood School
 Campbell Hall
 Castilleja School
 Cate School
 Chadwick School
 The College Preparatory School
 Crystal Springs Uplands School
 Flintridge Preparatory School
 Francis W. Parker School
 Harvard-Westlake School
 Head-Royce School
 Laguna Blanca School
 La Jolla Country Day School
 La Jolla High School
 Marin Academy
 Marlborough School
 Marymount High School
 Pacific Ridge School
 Polytechnic School
 Sacramento Country Day School
 St. Margaret's Episcopal School
 Santa Catalina School
 Sierra Canyon School
 Stevenson School
 The Thacher School
 Viewpoint School
 The Webb Schools
 Westridge School
 Windward School

Colorado
 Fountain Valley School
 Kent Denver School

Hawaii
 Hawaii Preparatory Academy
 Iolani School
 Seabury Hall

New Mexico
 Albuquerque Academy
 Santa Fe Preparatory School

Nevada
 The Meadows School

Oregon
 St. Mary's School

Utah
 Waterford School

Washington
 Charles Wright Academy
 Saint George's School

References 

Cum Laude Society